Vanessa Nuala Kirby (born 18 April 1988) is an English actress. She has received several accolades, including a BAFTA TV Award, in addition to nominations for an Academy Award and a Primetime Emmy Award.
	
Born in London to urologist Roger Kirby, Kirby studied English literature at the University of Exeter. After graduation, she made her professional acting debut on stage with a production of Arthur Miller's All My Sons (2010), and followed this with acclaimed performances in the plays A Midsummer Night's Dream (2010), As You Like It (2010), Women Beware Women (2011), Three Sisters (2012), and as Stella Kowalski in A Streetcar Named Desire (2014).

Kirby made her film debut with a minor role in the crime drama The Rise (2012), and rose to international prominence with her portrayal of Princess Margaret in the Netflix drama series The Crown (2016–2017), for which she won the British Academy Television Award for Best Supporting Actress and received a nomination for a Primetime Emmy Award. She took on roles in the action films Mission: Impossible – Fallout (2018) and Hobbs & Shaw (2019). For her performance as a grief-stricken young woman in Pieces of a Woman (2020), she won the Volpi Cup for Best Actress and received a nomination for the Academy Award for Best Actress.

Early life
Vanessa Kirby was born on 18 April 1988 in Wimbledon, London, to former Country Living magazine editor Jane and urologist Roger Kirby. She has two siblings, Joe and Juliet. Actors Vanessa Redgrave and Corin Redgrave were family friends. After attending Lady Eleanor Holles School and being turned down by Bristol Old Vic Theatre School, she took a gap year to travel before studying English at the University of Exeter.

Career

2009–2014: Early work and theatrical productions
Kirby turned down her place at the London Academy of Music and Dramatic Art after she was signed to a talent agency and met the theatre director David Thacker, who gave her three starring roles over 2009 at the Octagon Theatre Bolton: in All My Sons by Arthur Miller, Ghosts by Henrik Ibsen, and A Midsummer Night's Dream by William Shakespeare. For All My Sons she won the BIZA Rising Star Award at the Manchester Evening News Theatre Awards, worth £5,000.

In 2011, Kirby then went on to appear at the National Theatre as Isabella in Women Beware Women by Thomas Middleton, directed by Marianne Elliott, alongside Harriet Walter and Harry Melling. She then starred as Rosalind in As You Like It by William Shakespeare at the West Yorkshire Playhouse in Leeds; Alfred Hickling of The Guardian described her as a "significant new talent". In 2011, she was in the première of The Acid Test by Anya Reiss at the Royal Court Theatre, directed by Simon Godwin, earning praise for her performance from Paul Taylor of The Independent, who described her as "a star if ever I saw one". That same year, Kirby made her television debut in the BBC's The Hour. She played Estella in the BBC's mini-series adaptation of Great Expectations.

Kirby went on to play Masha in the acclaimed stage production by Benedict Andrews of Three Sisters at the Young Vic in September 2012, earning exceptionally good reviews, with Matt Trueman of Time Out stating: "In a super cast given licence to shine, Kirby stands out as Masha". She filmed The Rise in early 2012. The film premièred at the Toronto and London Film Festivals to favourable reviews, and won the Best Debut Category for director Rowan Athale.

In 2013, Kirby returned to the National Theatre to play Queen Isabella in Edward II opposite John Heffernan. In the summer of 2014, she played Stella in A Streetcar Named Desire, again collaborating with Benedict Andrews at the Young Vic, alongside Gillian Anderson as Blanche and Ben Foster as Stanley. She won Best Supporting Actress category at the Whatsonstage Awards 2014, which is voted for by the public. Kirby also appeared in Richard Curtis's romantic comedy film About Time.

2015–present: Screen roles and international recognition

In 2015, Kirby appeared in Everest as American socialite Sandy Hill Pittman, The Dresser, and in May of that year, was cast as Princess Margaret in Netflix's first original British series The Crown. Her selection came after a six-month search. For this role, she was nominated for a BAFTA award in 2017, and won the award for season two in 2018. She played Elena in Robert Icke's production of Uncle Vanya at the Almeida Theatre in 2016, for which she won rave reviews, with Matt Trueman of Variety writing: "Kirby is a superlative Elena: lithe, fickle, hypocritical, shallow and yet always sympathetic. It's a performance that confirms her as the outstanding stage actress of her generation, capable of the most unexpected choices." 
Throughout the late 2010s, Kirby appeared in several film such as John Boorman's sequel to his Hope and Glory (1987), Queen and Country (2014), the Wachowskis' Jupiter Ascending (2015), and Kill Command (2016).

In 2016, Variety described her as "the outstanding stage actress of her generation, capable of the most unexpected choices."

In 2018, Kirby played the title character in Polly Stenham's Julie, an adaptation of August Strindberg's Miss Julie, at the National Theatre. Kirby has since starred in two action franchise films, Mission: Impossible – Fallout (2018) opposite Tom Cruise and Fast and Furious: Hobbs & Shaw (2019) alongside Dwayne Johnson and Jason Statham.

In 2020, Kirby portrayed a grief-stricken woman in Kornél Mundruzcó's English debut Pieces of a Woman, a film portraying the degradation of a marriage. The film received generally positive reviews, with Kirby garnering universal critical acclaim. Peter Debruge wrote for Variety that "[...] this is ultimately Kirby's movie, as the stage marvel [...] delivers her most impressive screen performance to date." Rolling Stone called her performance "transcendent" and she won the Volpi Cup for Best Actress at the 2020 Venice Film Festival, where the film premiered. She went on to receive nominations for the Academy, Golden Globe, BAFTA, and Screen Actors Guild Award for Best Actress.

Kirby is set to reprise her dual role of Alanna Mitsopolis and White Widow in Mission: Impossible – Dead Reckoning Part One (2023) and Mission: Impossible – Dead Reckoning Part Two (2024). In 2022, she replaced Jodie Comer as Empress Josephine in the upcoming historical drama film Napoleon opposite Joaquin Phoenix as Napoleon, directed by Ridley Scott.

Kirby co-founded the London-based production company Aluna Entertainment which has a first look deal with Netflix.

Acting credits

Film

Television

Theatre

Music videos

Awards and nominations

References

External links
 

1988 births
21st-century English actresses
Actresses from London
Alumni of the University of Exeter
Audiobook narrators
Best Supporting Actress BAFTA Award (television) winners
English film actresses
English Shakespearean actresses
English stage actresses
English television actresses
English voice actresses
Living people
People educated at Lady Eleanor Holles School
People from Wimbledon, London
Volpi Cup for Best Actress winners